The Palm Desert Public Library is one of 35 libraries in the Riverside County Library System (RCLS). RCLS contracts with the library management company, Library Systems & Services, LLC, for library services. The library is located in south end of the Multi-Agency Library building on the College of the Desert campus in Palm Desert, California, United States.

References

 

Palm Desert, California
Public libraries in California